Popeye is a 1980 American musical comedy film directed by Robert Altman and produced by Paramount Pictures and Walt Disney Productions. It is based on E. C. Segar's Popeye comics character. The script was written by Jules Feiffer, and stars Robin Williams as Popeye the Sailor Man and Shelley Duvall as Olive Oyl. Its story follows Popeye's adventures as he arrives in the town of Sweethaven.

The film premiered on December 6, 1980 in Los Angeles, California and opened in the rest of the United States the following week. It grossed $6.3 million in its opening weekend, and $49.8 million worldwide, against a budget of $20 million. It received negative reviews from critics when it was first released, but has received improved reviews over time.

Plot 
Popeye, a strong sailor, arrives at the small coastal town of Sweethaven while searching for his missing father. He rents a room at the Oyl family's boarding house where the Oyls plan to have their daughter Olive become engaged to Captain Bluto, a powerful, perpetually angry bully who manages the town in the name of the mysterious Commodore. However, on the night of the engagement party, Olive sneaks out after discovering that the only attribute she can report for her bullying fiancé is size. She encounters Popeye, who failed to fit in with the townsfolk at the party. The two eventually find an abandoned baby in a basket. Popeye and Olive adopt the child, naming him Swee'Pea after the town Sweethaven, and the two return to the Oyls' home. Bluto, whom Olive has stood up, finds out about this encounter and, out of rage, beats up Popeye and imposes heavy taxes on the Oyls' property and possessions. A greedy taxman follows up on Bluto's demand, but Popeye helps the Oyls' financial situation, winning a hefty prize by defeating a boxer named Oxblood Oxheart.

The next day, Popeye discovers that Swee'Pea can predict the future by whistling when he hears the correct answer to a question. J. Wellington Wimpy, the constantly hungry local mooch and a petty gambler, also notices this and asks Popeye and Olive to take Swee'Pea for a walk. He actually takes him to the "horse races" (a mechanical carnival horse game) and wins two games. Hearing of this, Olive and her family decide to get in on the action and use Swee'Pea to win, but an outraged Popeye takes Swee'Pea away.

Later, after Popeye throws the taxman into the sea (thereby earning the town's respect), Wimpy kidnaps the child at Bluto's orders. Later that evening, when Olive checks in on Popeye privately, she overhears him lamenting that Swee'Pea deserves to have two parents and he regrets leaving the way he did. The next morning, Wimpy informs Popeye about the kidnapping after being threatened by Olive. Popeye goes to the Commodore's ship, where he learns that the Commodore, who has been recently tied up by Bluto, is indeed Popeye's father, Poopdeck Pappy, who accepts that Popeye is his son after exposing Popeye's hatred of spinach. Meanwhile, Bluto kidnaps Olive and sets sail with her and Swee'Pea to find the buried treasure promised by Pappy. Popeye, Pappy, Wimpy, and the Oyl family board Pappy's ship to chase Bluto to a desolate island in the middle of the ocean, called Scab Island.

Popeye catches up to Bluto and fights him but is overpowered. During the fight, Pappy recovers his treasure and opens the chest to reveal a collection of personal sentimental items from Popeye's infancy, including a few cans of spinach. Salty Sam, a gigantic octopus, awakens and attacks Olive from underwater after Pappy saves Swee'Pea from a similar fate. With Popeye in a choke hold, Pappy throws him a can of spinach; recognizing Popeye's dislike for spinach, Bluto force-feeds him the can before throwing him into the water. The spinach revitalizes Popeye and boosts his strength, helping him to defeat both Bluto and Salty Sam. Popeye celebrates his victory and his newfound appreciation of spinach while Bluto swims off, having literally turned yellow.

Cast

Production 

In his book Fiasco: A History of Hollywood's Iconic Flops, James Robert Parish said the Popeye musical had its basis in the bidding war for the film adaptation of the Broadway musical Annie between the two major studios vying for the rights, Columbia and Paramount. When Robert Evans learned that Paramount had lost the bidding for Annie, he held an executive meeting with Charles Bluhdorn, head of Paramount’s parent company Gulf+Western, and executives Barry Diller, Michael Eisner, and Jeffrey Katzenberg in which he asked about comic strip characters to which the studio held the rights, which could be used to create a movie musical, and one attendee said "Popeye".

At that time, even though King Features Syndicate (now a unit of Hearst Communications) retained the television rights to Popeye and related characters, with Hanna-Barbera then producing the series The All-New Popeye Hour under license from King Features, Paramount had long held the theatrical rights to the Popeye character, due to the studio's having released Popeye cartoon shorts produced by Fleischer Studios and Famous Studios from 1932 to 1957.

Evans commissioned Jules Feiffer to write a script. In 1977, he said he wanted Dustin Hoffman to play Popeye opposite Lily Tomlin as Olive Oyl, with John Schlesinger directing. Hoffman later dropped out due to creative differences with Feiffer. Gilda Radner, then popular as an original cast member of Saturday Night Live, was also considered for the Olive Oyl role. Radner's manager Bernie Brillstein discouraged her from taking the part due to his concerns about the quality of the script and worries about her working for months on an isolated set with Evans and Altman, both known for erratic behavior and unorthodox creative methods.

In December 1979, Disney joined the film as part of a two-picture production deal (including Dragonslayer) with Paramount. Disney acquired the foreign rights through its Buena Vista unit; the deal was motivated by the drawing power that the studio's films had in Europe.

Principal photography commenced on January 23, 1980. The film was shot in Malta. The elaborate Sweethaven set was constructed beyond what was needed for filming, adding to the cost and complexity of the production, along with a recording studio, editing facilities, and other buildings, including living quarters. Filming wrapped on June 19, 1980, three weeks over schedule due to bad weather. The set is a popular tourist attraction known as Popeye Village. Parish wrote that Robin Williams referred to this set as "Stalag Altman".

Parish noted other production problems. Evans insisted the screenplay reflect the comic strip Popeye and not the "distorted" cartoon version. Feiffer's script went through several rewrites, and he expressed concern that too much screen time was being devoted to minor characters. Feiffer also disliked Nilsson's songs, saying they weren't right for the film. Popeye's original muscle arms formed of silicone rubber were difficult for Williams to manipulate and remove after filming, so two Italian artisans were brought to Malta to remake them and Altman had to juggle his shooting schedule. He also had the cast sing some musical numbers during filming, breaking with the traditional movie-musical practice of actors recording the songs in a studio first and then lip-synching. This reduced the sound quality due to difficulties in accurately capturing the voices. Williams re-recorded his dialogue due to trouble with his character's mumbling style as a by-product of talking with a pipe in his mouth. His penchant for ad-libs led to clashes with the director. The final battle involving the octopus was complicated by the mechanical beast's malfunction. After the production cost rose beyond $20 million, Paramount ordered Altman to wrap filming and return to California with what he had.

Release 

Popeye premiered at the Mann's Chinese Theater in Los Angeles on December 6, 1980, two days before what would have been E.C. Segar's 86th birthday.

Home media 
Popeye has been released to several home media formats including VHS, Betamax, CED, Laserdisc, DVD, and through digital services in SD (Standard Definition) and HD (High Definition) video resolution. Paramount Home Entertainment released the first Blu-ray Disc edition of Popeye on December 1, 2020, in honor of the film's 40th anniversary.

Reception 
The reception with the public and critics was "so toxic" that "Altman was left unemployable and exiled to Paris, directing micro-budgeted indie theater adaptations for the remainder of the decade."

Box office 
The film grossed $6 million on its opening weekend in the United States, and made $32,000,000 after 32 days. The film earned US$49,823,037 at the United States box office — more than double the film's budget — and a worldwide total of $60 million.

Film Comment wrote "Before the film's release, industry wags were mocking producer Robert Evans by calling it 'Evansgate'" but "Apparently the film has caught on solidly with young children."

Although the film's gross was decent, it was not the blockbuster that Paramount and Disney had expected, and was thus written off as a disappointment.

It had "an astonishingly lucrative home video run that continues to this day [2015]".

Critical response 
Reviews at the time were negative but the film has been more positively reappraised over time.
On Rotten Tomatoes, the film has an approval rating of 58% based on reviews from 43 critics, with the critical consensus stating [that] "Altman's take on the iconic cartoon is messy and wildly uneven, but its robust humor and manic charm are hard to resist." On Metacritic it has a score of 64 out of 100, based on reviews from 14 critics, indicating "generally favorable reviews".

Roger Ebert gave the film 3.5 stars out of 4, writing that Duvall was "born to play" Olive Oyl, and with Popeye Altman had proved "it is possible to take the broad strokes of a comic strip and turn them into sophisticated entertainment." Gene Siskel also awarded 3.5 out of 4, writing that the first 30 minutes were "tedious and totally without a point of view", but once Swee'pea was introduced the film "then becomes quite entertaining and, in a few scenes, very special". Richard Combs of The Monthly Film Bulletin wrote, "In its own idiosyncratic fashion, it works."

Other critics were unfavorable, such as Leonard Maltin, who described the picture as a bomb: "E.C. Segar's beloved sailorman boards a sinking ship in this astonishingly boring movie. A game cast does its best with an unfunny script, cluttered staging, and some alleged songs. Tune in a couple hours' worth of Max Fleischer cartoons instead; you'll be much better off." Vincent Canby of The New York Times called it "a thoroughly charming, immensely appealing mess of a movie, often high-spirited and witty, occasionally pretentious and flat, sometimes robustly funny and frequently unintelligible. It is, in short, a very mixed bag." Variety wrote that all involved "fail to bring the characters to life at the sacrifice of a large initial chunk of the film. It's only when they allow the characters to fall back on their cartoon craziness that the picture works at all." Gary Arnold of The Washington Post wrote, "While there are things to like in this elaborately stylized, exasperating musical slapstick fantasy ... they emerge haphazardly and flit in and out of a precarious setting." Charles Champlin of the Los Angeles Times described the film as "rarely uninteresting but seldom entirely satisfying", and thought that the adult tone of the dialogue left it "uncertain what the film's target audience is intended to be." TV Guide says, "This film from director Robert Altman and scenarist Jules Feiffer adapts 'Popeye' to feature length – a good idea gone down the drain under Altman's spotty direction. Only in the last 50 minutes does Popeye create some excitement."

Legacy 
Several authors have contrasted Popeye with later comic book movies. One article calls it a "road not taken" in comic book adaptations. The author praised Popeye, Dick Tracy, and Hulk for using comic techniques such as "masking, paneling, and page layout" in ways the DC Extended Universe and Marvel Cinematic Universe do not. Another article agreed that Popeye and Hulk were more "artistic" than modern comic movies, and said that Popeye has been "mistakenly" overlooked.

Accolades 
The film won the Stinkers Bad Movie Award for Worst Picture in its original ballot, and again in the expanded ballot in 2006. The film also received a Saturn Award nomination for Best Fantasy Film.

Soundtrack

Original release 

The soundtrack was composed by Harry Nilsson, who took a break from producing his album Flash Harry to score the film. He wrote all the original songs and co-produced the music with producer Bruce Robb at Cherokee Studios. The soundtrack in the film was unusual in that the actors sang some of the songs "live". For that reason, the studio album did not quite match the tracks heard in the film. Van Dyke Parks is credited as music arranger.

The U.S. trailer contains the song "I Yam What I Yam" from the soundtrack album, not the film's live performance.

"I'm Popeye the Sailor Man" was composed by Sammy Lerner for the original Max Fleischer cartoon Popeye the Sailore.

The song "Everything Is Food" was not included on the album, and the song "Din' We" (which was cut from the film) was included. In 2016, a vinyl-only limited-edition version of the album was released with two bonus tracks by Varèse Sarabande for Record Store Day Black Friday.

2017 deluxe edition 
In 2017, Varèse Sarabande released a deluxe edition that places the songs into the original order of the film, reinstates "Everything Is Food", and includes a second disc of demo versions of the songs sung by Nilsson and the cast.
 Disc 1

 Disc 2

References

Further reading

External links 

 
 
 
 

1980 films
1980 romantic comedy films
American adventure comedy films
American musical comedy films
American romantic comedy films
American romantic musical films
1980s English-language films
Films based on comic strips
Films directed by Robert Altman
Films produced by Robert Evans
Films shot in Malta
Films with screenplays by Jules Feiffer
Harry Nilsson
Live-action films based on animated series
Live-action films based on comics
Paramount Pictures films
Pirate films
Popeye
Seafaring films
Walt Disney Pictures films
1980s American films

ja:ポパイ#ポパイ（1980年実写版）